Reed Township is located in Will County, Illinois. As of the 2010 census, its population was 6,948 and it contained 3,259 housing units. Reed Township was originally named Clinton Township, but was changed on June 10, 1850.

Geography

Demographics

References

External links
City-data.com
Will County Official Site
Illinois State Archives

Townships in Will County, Illinois
Townships in Illinois
1850 establishments in Illinois